Hot Country Songs is a chart that ranks the top-performing country music songs in the United States, published by Billboard magazine since 1958, when the magazine amalgamated its separate C&W Best Sellers in Stores and Most Played C&W by Jockeys charts.  In 1959, eleven different songs topped the chart, then published under the title Hot C&W Sides, in 52 issues of the magazine, based on playlists submitted by country music radio stations and sales reports submitted by stores.

At the start of the year the song at number one was "City Lights" by Ray Price.  The song had been in the top spot since the issue of Billboard dated October 20, 1958, the first in which the magazine combined country sales and airplay into a single chart, and remained at number one until the issue dated January 19, 1959.  Four artists achieved a number one country single for the first time in 1959: Johnny Horton with "When It's Springtime in Alaska (It's Forty Below)", George Jones with "White Lightning", which replaced Horton's song at number one, Stonewall Jackson with "Waterloo", and the Browns with "The Three Bells".  Of these, Jones would prove to have the most prolific career, topping the Hot Country chart in four consecutive decades.  At the time of his death in 2013, he had placed more singles on Billboards charts than any other artist in any genre.

Following Jones' spell at number one, Johnny Horton returned to the top spot with "The Battle of New Orleans", which spent ten weeks at the peak of the chart.  His total of eleven weeks at number one was the most by any artist; he and Ray Price were the only artists to place more than one song at number one during the year. "The Battle of New Orleans" tied with "The Three Bells" for the most weeks spent at number one by a song during the year.  Both tracks also topped Billboards all-genres chart, the Hot 100.  Despite the success of "The Three Bells", it would prove to be the only country number one for the Browns.  Of the nine acts who topped the chart in 1959, seven have been inducted into the Country Music Hall of Fame: Ray Price, Jim Reeves, Johnny Cash, George Jones, the Browns, Faron Young and Marty Robbins.  Robbins ended the year at number one with "El Paso", another crossover hit which also topped the Hot 100.

Chart history

See also
1959 in music
1959 in country music
List of artists who reached number one on the U.S. country chart

References

1959
Country
1959 record charts